Blackett-Ord is an English surname. Rev. John Alexander Blackett (1803–1865), Rector of Wolsingham and youngest son of Christopher Blackett, was the first member of the Blackett family to adopt this surname.

People
Charles Blackett-Ord (1858–1931), Archdeacon of Northumberland
Jim Blackett-Ord (1921–2012), British barrister and judge

See also
Blackett
Ord (surname)

Compound surnames
English-language surnames
Surnames of English origin